Nosenko is a Ukrainian surname. Notable people with the surname include:

 Ivan Nosenko (1902–1956), Soviet politician
 Vladislav Nosenko (born 1969), Azerbaijani footballer
 Yuri Nosenko (1927–2008), KGB officer who defected to US.

See also
 

Ukrainian-language surnames